Red Crow Mountain is a  mountain summit located in Glacier National Park in the U.S. state of Montana. The summit is set on the border shared by Flathead County and Glacier County. It is situated on the Continental Divide so precipitation runoff from the east side of the mountain drains into Railroad Creek which is part of the Two Medicine River watershed, and the west side drains to Ole Creek, which is a tributary of Middle Fork Flathead River. It is set in the Lewis Range, 6.5 miles southwest of East Glacier Park Village. The nearest higher neighbor is Calf Robe Mountain 1.2 mile to the southeast, with Firebrand Pass forming the saddle between these two peaks.

Etymology 
The mountain's name commemorates Red Crow (1830–1900), leader of the Kainai. The name was officially adopted in 1911 by the United States Board on Geographic Names.

Geology 

Like other mountains in Glacier National Park, Red Crow Mountain is composed of sedimentary rock laid down during the Precambrian to Jurassic periods.

Climate 
According to the Köppen climate classification system, Red Crow Mountain is located in an alpine subarctic climate zone with long, cold, snowy winters, and cool to warm summers. Winter temperatures can drop below −10 °F with wind chill factors below −30 °F. Due to its altitude, it receives precipitation all year, as snow in winter, and as thunderstorms in summer.

See also

 Mountains and mountain ranges of Glacier National Park (U.S.)
 Geology of the Rocky Mountains

References

External links 
 Weather forecast: Red Crow Mountain
 Hiking video: YouTube
 Red Crow Mountain photo album: Flickr

Mountains of Glacier County, Montana
Mountains of Flathead County, Montana
Mountains of Glacier National Park (U.S.)
Lewis Range
Mountains of Montana
North American 2000 m summits